Rajiv Patil was a National Award Winner, Marathi film director, best known for directing the film Jogwa. He was a Nashik based theatre writer and director. He also directed the Marathi movie "Vanshvel" and "72 Miles: Ek Pravas".

Patil died following a heart attack in Mumbai's Bhagwati Hospital on Monday, Oct 1, 2013.

Filmography
Sawarkhed Ek Gaon (2004)
Jai 18 Bhuja saptshrungimata (2006)
Blind Game (2006)
Oxigen (2008)
Sanai Chaughade (2008)
Jogwa (2008) 
Pangira (2010)
72 Miles: Ek Pravas (2013)
Vanshvel (2013)

Awards and recognitions
5 National Awards For Jogwa Including Best Film on Social Issue 
Maharashtra State Government Awards For Jogwa Including Best Film, Best Director 
V. Shantaram Best Film Awards For Jogwa 
Sanskruti Kaladarpan Best Film Awards For Jogwa
MA.TA. Sanman Best Film Awards For Jogwa

References

Marathi film directors
2013 deaths
1973 births
Directors who won the Best Film on Other Social Issues National Film Award